Loyew  or Loyev, ;  is a town in the Belarusian province of Homiel and the administrative centre of Loyew Raion. The population is 6,698 (2018).

The settlement is located along the right coast of the Dnieper River at its confluence with the Sozh.

Loyew arose on the site of an ancient settlement of the Dregoviches within Principality of Chernigov. The settlement was situated on the route from the Varangians to the Greeks. The first mention of the Loyew goes back to 1505 and it was known as Loyewa Hara (Loyew Hill). The name is probably derived from the Abkhaz-Adyghe surname Loo. The town is known for the Battle of Loyew of July 31, 1649 during the Khmelnytsky Uprising. After the division of the Rzecz Pospolita in 1793, it became a part of the Russian Empire. According to the results of the census held in 1897 the town had 4,667 inhabitants, among them 2150 Jews. There were 251 farms, 9 mills, 24 shops, 1 school, 1 post-office, 2 orthodox churches, 1 catholic church and 1 synagogue.

In December 1926 Loyew was included in the Belarusian SSR and became the center of a raion. In 1938 it was granted the status of a city. In 1941–1943, the city lost nearly 1,500 inhabitants. In 1962-1966 it was placed in the Rečyca Raion.
In the city there are building materials and dairy factories, a pedagogical school and musical school, a house of culture, and some libraries. There is The Church of the Holy Trinity in Loyew.

References

External links 
 Informational portal "Loeuski kraj"
 Loyew on Globus.tut.by

Urban-type settlements in Belarus
Populated places in Gomel Region
Loyew District
Belarus–Ukraine border crossings
Populated places on the Dnieper in Belarus